The McPolin Farmstead is a historic farm north of Park City, Utah, United States. It was purchased by, and is owned by, the nearby city of Park City, Utah. It was listed on the National Register of Historic Places in 2003.

References

External links

 McPolin Farm at parkcity.org

Buildings and structures completed in 1921
Buildings and structures in Park City, Utah
Farms on the National Register of Historic Places in Utah
National Register of Historic Places in Summit County, Utah